The Rhinohorn goby, Girdled goby or Skunk goby (Redigobius balteatus) is a species of goby native to the Sri Lanka, Philippines, Malaysia, Indonesia, Japan, New Guinea, Madagascar, and Mozambique. This species inhabits coastal estuaries, lakes and freshwater streams. It can reach a length of  SL.

References

 https://www.itis.gov/servlet/SingleRpt/SingleRpt?search_topic=TSN&search_value=637941
 http://www.fishesofaustralia.net.au/Home/species/153

Redigobius
Fish described in 1935